Wojciech Grzyb  (born 21 December 1974) is a Polish football manager and former player. He currently serves as an assistant and fitness coach for Ruch Chorzów.

In a past he was player of Górnik 09 Mysłowice, Victoria Jaworzno, Ruch Radzionków, Odra Wodzisław and Ruch Chorzów.

References

1974 births
Living people
People from Mysłowice
Sportspeople from Silesian Voivodeship
Association football defenders
Association football midfielders
Polish footballers
Ruch Chorzów players
Victoria Jaworzno players
Ruch Radzionków players
Odra Wodzisław Śląski players
Ekstraklasa players
I liga players
Polish football managers